Calendar Girls is a stage play based on the 2003 film of the same name.

Production history
The play was adapted by Tim Firth and directed by Hamish McColl.

After a successful try-out at the Chichester Festival Theatre in September 2008 and a lengthy national tour, a stage adaptation of the film started previewing  on 4 April 2009 at the Noël Coward Theatre in the West End, opening on 20 April. The original cast included Lynda Bellingham, Patricia Hodge, Siân Phillips, Gaynor Faye, Brigit Forsyth, Julia Hills and Elaine C. Smith.

While the play was a financial success (it took in over £1.7 million in advance ticket sales), the critical reception was mixed. 

The play closed at the Noël Coward Theatre in London on 9 January 2010 before embarking on a second national tour which began on 27 January 2010. The show had several different casts to keep it fresh and to also allow producers to bring well known actresses into the play who do not want to commit to long runs. The second national tour finished in December 2012.

Toronto's Mirvish Productions announced in February 2010 that a Canadian production of the play would open in Toronto in April 2011, with the North American premiere actually taking place at the Manitoba Theatre Centre in Winnipeg in March 2011.
In Australia the play was toured throughout Queensland, New South Wales, Victoria, South Australia and Western Australia in 45 venues during 2014.

In September 2016, Tim Firth and Gary Barlow announced The Girls, a new musical based on both the play and the film, was to open at the Phoenix Theatre in January 2017.

Casting

Cast and characters

Notable Replacements 
 Chris: Anita Dobson, Arabella Weir, Gemma Craven, Elaine C. Smith, Lesley Joseph 
 Annie: Jill Baker, Janie Dee, Jan Harvey, Sue Holderness, Julia Hills, Trudie Goodwin
 Jessie: June Brown, Rosalind Knight, Judith Barker, Anne Charleston, Jean Boht, Gwen Taylor, Helen Fraser
 Celia: Jerry Hall, Kelly Brook, Gemma Atkinson, Charlie Dimmock, Jennifer Ellison, Brenda Gilhooly, Rula Lenska, Sue Holderness
 Marie: Richenda Carey, Helen Lederer, Elizabeth Bennett, Ruth Madoc
 Ruth: Sara Crowe, Debbie Chazen, Hannah Waterman, Lisa Riley, Kacey Ainsworth
 Cora: Jill Halfpenny, Julie Goodyear, Hannah Waterman, Letitia Dean, Denise Black, Michelle Collins, Bernie Nolan, Deena Payne, Jennifer Ellison
 Lady Cravenshire/Brenda Hulse: Delia Lindsay, Margaret John, Diana Moran
 Elaine: Gemma Atkinson, Jan Leeming, Mikyla Dodd, Danielle Lineker, Camilla Dallerup
 Lawrence/Liam: Jack Ryder, Carl Prekopp, Dean Gaffney, Bruno Langley, Kevin Sacre
 John: Will Knightley, Colin Tarrant, Joe McGann

Amateur Productions 
The amateur rights were released from 1 September 2012 for 18 months only.  By August 2012, 520 applications had been received and 322 licences granted.

Bermuda
On April 11, 2013, The Bermuda Musical and Dramatic Society opened their amateur production of "Calendar Girls" at the Earl Cameron Theater in Hamilton, Bermuda. In addition to the stage play, the group also produced a calendar featuring the cast, producer and director in similar poses. Thanks to the sponsorship of local businesses, all the calendar proceeds were donated to Bermuda charities.

Geneva, Switzerland
The Geneva English Drama Society (GEDS) produced "Calendar Girls" from 18 to 22 June, 2013 at the Théâtre Pitoëff in Geneva.  A special charity performance attended by  Angela Baker (Miss February in the original calendar) and sales of a calendar enabled a donation of CHF 6,000 to each of the Fondation Dr Henri Dubois-Ferrière Dinu Lipatti and the Fondation Artères, local charities targeting leukaemia and lymphoma.

References

2008 plays
Plays based on films
West End plays
Plays based on actual events
Plays set in England
Comedy plays